The Iron Moonhunter is a short children's picture book published in 1977, written and illustrated by the activist Kathleen Chang. The book purportedly retells a Chinese-American myth set in the Sierra Nevada mountains during the construction of the First transcontinental railroad, starting in the fall of 1866.

Synopsis

Chinese laborers that were hired to work in America received a hostile reception from white competition upon their arrival in San Francisco. While building the Central Pacific portion of the Transcontinental Railroad, an explosion set by white rivals killed several Chinese workers. The three Kwan cousins (Kwan Ming, Kwan Cheong, and Kwan Hop) fought back, finding and punishing the guilty, but modestly stated they were only living up to the legacy of their ancestor, Kwan Kung.

The following spring, the Chinese workers began to see the restless spirits of their comrades who had died while working on the railroads.

One worker, Jeong Yum, erupted with hatred and agitated the men to blow up the railroad and rebel against their white supervisors. Kwan Ming instead counseled patience and pride: "Talk sense, men. The railroad is our work and we should be proud of it. We're going to finish it because when we Tong Yun say we'll do something, we don't stop halfway." He laid out a plan to build a railroad for the spirits, using leftover steel rails and scrap metal from crashed trains to build the Iron Moonhunter, a dragon-shaped train, which played a song to alert the restless spirits:

After reuniting the spirits with their loved ones, the workers continued to build track throughout the Sierra, stopping the train to help the needy. According to the legend, the Iron Moonhunter still plies the tracks, helping the Chinese in America.

Development

Chang states The Iron Moonhunter comes from a legend passed down from the time of the Transcontinental Railroad. However, the first known appearance of the Iron Moonhunter is in Frank Chin's play The Chickencoop Chinaman (1972), where Tam Lum explains it is a "train built by Chinamans who knew they'd never be given passes to ride the rails they laid", a "wild engine to take them home" built from stolen iron and steel. Sau-ling Cynthia Wong speculates that as it is supposedly based on an unpublished private oral history, the Iron Moonhunter may have been invented by Chin, who was married to Chang in the early 1970s.

Publication history
 
 

According to the book's copyright page, the original text and illustrations passed into the public domain in 1987.

Legacy
The Iron Moonhunter was dramatized by Calleen Sinnette Jennings, Mary Hall Surface, Eric Wilson (book & lyrics); Deirdre Kelly Lavrakas (concept); and Deborah Wicks La Puma (music & lyrics) as part of Walking the Winds: American Tales, an original musical which was commissioned by the Kennedy Center, where it premiered in 1996.

Curtis Choy's production company, Chonk Moonhunter, takes part of its name from the legend of the Iron Moonhunter.

References

External links

 , from the album Walking the Winds: American Tales by Deborah Wicks LaPuma (2000)

1977 children's books
California in fiction